Miyata is a Japanese surname. Notable people with the surname include:

Actors 
Hironori Miyata (born 1960), voice actor
Kazuko Miyata (born 1969), film and television actor
Kōki Miyata, voice actor

Athletes 
Daichi Miyata (born 1996), figure skater
Fúlvio Miyata (born 1977), Brazilian judoka
Kazuyuki Miyata (born 1976), mixed martial artist
Koji Miyata (born 1923), footballer
Naoki Miyata (born 1987), footballer
Ritomo Miyata (born 1999), racing driver
Shoko Miyata (born 2004), artistic gymnast
, Japanese table tennis player
Yukari Miyata (born 1989), volleyball player

Musicians 
Kōhachiro Miyata (born 1938), flautist and composer
Mako Miyata, singer
Mayumi Miyata, shō player

Other 
Atsushi Miyata (born 1981), professional shogi player
Marino Miyata (born 1991), former beauty pageant titleholder
Masayuki Miyata (1926–1997), kiri-e artist
Noboru Miyata (1936–2000), folklorist

See also 
Miyata

Japanese-language surnames